Nils Klein (14 July 1878 – 28 February 1936) was a Swedish sports shooter. He competed in the men's trap event at the 1912 Summer Olympics.

References

1878 births
1936 deaths
Swedish male sport shooters
Olympic shooters of Sweden
Shooters at the 1912 Summer Olympics
Sport shooters from Stockholm